The Cueva de la Quebrada del Toro is a cave in the Sierra de Falcón in Falcón State, Venezuela. It is an active river cave, through which flows the largest known underground watercourse in Venezuela.  It is protected as the Cueva de la Quebrada del Toro National Park.

Wildlife
Like the Cueva del Guácharo National Park, it has a population of oil-birds (steatornis caripensis).

External links 

Caves of Venezuela
National parks of Venezuela
Protected areas established in 1961
Geography of Falcón
1961 establishments in Venezuela
Tourist attractions in Falcón